Oak Harbor School District 201 is located on the north end of Whidbey Island, serving the town of Oak Harbor and surrounding area in Washington state.

List of schools

Elementary
Broadview Elementary 
Crescent Harbor Elementary  
Hillcrest Elementary  
Oak Harbor Elementary 
Olympic View Elementary

Middle
Oak Harbor Intermediate School
North Whidbey Middle School

High
Oak Harbor High School

External links
District website

See also
List of school districts in Washington

School districts in Washington (state)
Education in Island County, Washington